Paolo Mojo, originally from St. Helens, Merseyside, but now based in London, United Kingdom, is an English electronica DJ. His style incorporates the genres of house, funk, techno, breaks, electro, disco, and acid music. He was the mixer behind the Renaissance label's Renaissance Digital 01: Paolo Mojo, which was the first DJ mix to be made exclusively for an iTunes release. He also compiled the 9th in the Balance series of DJ mix compilations, released by EQ Recordings since 2001.

Releases
Back In The Day (12") 		Sabotage Systems 	2003
Dirty Bwaad (12", Ltd) 		Orc Music 	2004
Kunteebumm (12") 		Music Is Freedom 	2004
Discotech EP (12") 		Honchos Music 	2005
Motor Strings (12") 		Sensei 	2005
1983 (12") 		Pryda Friends 	2006
Balance 009 (2xCD) 		EQ Recordings 	2006
Everybody (Drop Kick) (12") 		Oosh 	2006
Rukus (12") 		Saved Records 	2006
Darkplace (12") 		Oosh 	2007
JMJ (12", Single) 		Oosh 	2007
Renaissance Digital 01 (File, MP3) 		Renaissance 	2007
"Interstellar" (2008), Oosh
Remixes:
Cosmic Cons (12")

References

External links
 Paolo Mojo's website
 Paolo Mojo's Myspace page

English DJs
Living people
Musicians from London
People from St Helens, Merseyside
Year of birth missing (living people)
Progressive house musicians
Electronic dance music DJs